Murt-e Hadi (also Romanized as Mūrt-e Hādī) is a village in Vizhenan Rural District, in the Central District of Gilan-e Gharb County, Kermanshah Province, Iran. At the 2006 census, its population was 59, in 14 families.

References 

Populated places in Gilan-e Gharb County